Bob Anderson may refer to:

Sports
 Bob Anderson (fencer) (1922–2012), swordmaster and stunt double for Darth Vader in the Star Wars films
 Bob Anderson (footballer) (1924–1994), Scottish footballer
 Bob Anderson (racing driver) (1931–1967), British Formula One driver and motorcycle racer
 Bob Anderson (baseball) (1935–2015), Major League Baseball pitcher, 1957–1963
 Bob Anderson (American football) (born 1938), member of the College Football Hall of Fame
 Bob Anderson (wrestler) (born 1944), American wrestler
 Bob Anderson (runner) (born 1947), founder of magazine Runner's World
 Bob Anderson (darts player) (born 1947), world professional darts champion (1988) from England

Other
 Bob Anderson (director) (born 1965), animation director for The Simpsons
 Bob Anderson (engineer), one of the pioneers of the artificial cardiac pacemaker
 Bob Anderson (Days of our Lives), a character from Days of our Lives
 Bob Anderson (politician) (born 1939), Canadian politician
 Bob Anderson (entertainer), American singer and entertainer

See also
Robert Anderson (disambiguation)
Bobby Anderson (disambiguation)